I Can See Your Voice is a South Korean mystery music game show series. It features a group of "mystery singers", with the objective of guest artist(s) are to eliminate potential bad singers, assisted by clues and celebrity panelists; and the game ends with a duet between the last remaining mystery singer and one of the guest artist(s).

Overall, the series has played 140 guest artists that aired nine seasons and 119 episodes on two different networks — Mnet and tvN (from its debut on February 26, 2015 to April 16, 2022). In the milestones, Hwang Chi-yeul played in the 100th episode on April 2, 2021. An upcoming tenth season is scheduled to premiere in March 22, 2023.

In nine seasons that original program aired, four consecutive, annually-held seasons have premiered in January. It also aired two specials — Star Wars, a team-based battle featuring mystery singers from the past; and Global Stars, a regular game featuring mystery singers from local ICSYV counterparts.

Series overview

Episodes

Season 1 (2015)

Season 2 (2015—16)

Season 3 (2016)

Season 4 (2017)

Season 5 (2018)

Season 6 (2019)

Season 7 (2020)

Season 8 (2021)

Season 9 (2022)

Season 10 (2023)

Specials

Notes

References

I Can See Your Voice (South Korean game show)
Lists of South Korean television series episodes